Emotion(s) in Motion may refer to:

 "Emotion in Motion" (song), a song by Ric Ocasek
 Emotion in Motion (album), an album by Ananda Shake
"Emotions in Motion", a song on the album of the same name by Billy Squier
 Emotions in Motion (Takayoshi Ohmura album)
 Emotions in Motion, an album by Rudy Linka